Iolaus banco, the Banco fine sapphire, is a butterfly in the family Lycaenidae. It is found in Ivory Coast and western Ghana.

See also
Banco National Park

References

Butterflies described in 1966
Iolaus (butterfly)